The 2022–23 season is Al-Nassr's 47th consecutive season in the top flight of Saudi football and 67th year in existence as a football club. The club will participate in the Pro League, the King Cup, and the Super Cup.

The season covers the period from 1 July 2022 to 30 June 2023.

This season, the club brought in Cristiano Ronaldo, a player that many consider as one of the greatest to ever play the sport. He signed a contract for two-and-a-half years until 2025, with a total salary of €200 million per year, thought to be the highest salary ever paid to a professional footballer. He made an immediate impact on the global following of the club, with their Instagram account growing from 860,000 followers before his move to over 10 million followers less than a week later.

Players

Squad information

Unregistered players

Out on loan

Transfers and loans

Transfers in

Loans in

Transfers out

Loans out

Pre-season and friendies

Competitions

Overview

Goalscorers

Last Updated: 18 March 2023

Clean sheets

Last Updated: 25 February 2023

References

Notes

Al Nassr FC seasons
Nassr